After winning 91 games the previous two seasons, the 1964 Minnesota Twins slumped to 79–83, a disappointing tie for sixth with the Cleveland Indians in the American League, 20 games behind the AL champion New York Yankees.

Offseason 
 December 2, 1963: Rudy May was drafted from the Twins by the Chicago White Sox in the 1963 first-year draft.

Regular season 
On May 2, in Kansas City, Missouri, Tony Oliva, Bob Allison, Jimmie Hall and Harmon Killebrew hit consecutive 11th-inning home runs, to tie a major league record first set by the Milwaukee Braves in 1961 and duplicated by the Cleveland Indians in 1963.  The Twins finished the year with 221 homers, their second-best total ever.

On July 15, new Twin Mudcat Grant allowed thirteen singles and a walk in facing the Washington Senators.  None would score, and Grant pitches a shutout, 6–0.

Five Twins made the All-Star Game: first baseman Bob Allison, outfielders Harmon Killebrew, Jimmie Hall and Tony Oliva and pitcher Camilo Pascual.

Tony Oliva became the first black player in the history of the American League to win the AL Rookie of the Year award. He led the major leagues in hits (217), extra base hits and total bases.  He led the American League in batting average (.323), runs scored (109) and doubles.

Six Twins hit 20 or more home runs: Harmon Killebrew (49 HR, 111 RBI), Tony Oliva (32 HR, 96 RBI, 109 runs), Bob Allison (32 HR, 86 RBI), Jimmie Hall (25 HR, 75 RBI), Don Mincher (23 HR, 56 RBI), and Zoilo Versalles (20 HR, 94 runs).

Jim Kaat led the Twins with 17 wins and won his third Gold Glove; Camilo Pascual again led the Twins in strikeouts with 213.

1,207,514 fans attended Twins games, the third highest total in the American League.

Season standings

Record vs. opponents

Notable transactions 
 June 6, 1964: Andy Kosco was signed as a free agent by the Twins.
 June 24, 1964: Rod Carew was signed as an amateur free agent by the Twins.

Roster

Player stats

Batting

Starters by position 
Note: Pos = Position; G = Games played; AB = At bats; H = Hits; Avg. = Batting average; HR = Home runs; RBI = Runs batted in

Other batters 
Note: G = Games played; AB = At bats; H = Hits; Avg. = Batting average; HR = Home runs; RBI = Runs batted in

Pitching

Starting pitchers 
Note: G = Games pitched; IP = Innings pitched; W = Wins; L = Losses; ERA = Earned run average; SO = Strikeouts

Other pitchers 
Note: G = Games pitched; IP = Innings pitched; W = Wins; L = Losses; ERA = Earned run average; SO = Strikeouts

Relief pitchers 
Note: G = Games pitched; W = Wins; L = Losses; SV = Saves; ERA = Earned run average; SO = Strikeouts

Farm system 

LEAGUE CHAMPIONS: Melbourne

Notes

References 
Player stats from www.baseball-reference.com
Team info from www.baseball-almanac.com

Minnesota Twins seasons
Minnesota Twins season
Minnesota Twins